Cytochrome P450 4B1 is a protein that in humans is encoded by the CYP4B1 gene.

This gene encodes a member of the cytochrome P450 superfamily of enzymes. The cytochrome P450 proteins are monooxygenases which catalyze many reactions involved in drug metabolism and synthesis of cholesterol, steroids and other lipids. This protein localizes to the endoplasmic reticulum. In rodents, the homologous protein has been shown to metabolize certain carcinogens; however, the specific function of the human protein has not been determined.

References

External links

Further reading